Brewster Hillard Morris (February 7, 1909 - September 3, 1990) was an American diplomat. He was the United States Ambassador to Chad from 1963 to 1967.

Biography
Morris was born in Bryn Mawr, Montgomery County, Pennsylvania, on February 7, 1909. He graduated from Haverford College in 1930 and later joined the U.S. Foreign Service. He served as Vice Consul in Montreal, Quebec, Canada (1938), and Stockholm, Sweden (1943). He also served in Berlin (before and after World War II), Moscow, London, Bonn, Montreal, Vienna, Dresden, and Frankfurt. In 1963, Morris was nominated to be the United States Ambassador to Chad by President Kennedy, and was confirmed on August 12, 1963. He served in that post until January 20, 1967. He later retired from the Foreign Service and died at his home in Tiburon, California, on September 3, 1990. He was 81 years old.

References

External links
 United States Department of State: Chiefs of Mission for Chad
 United States Department of State: Chad
 United States Embassy in N'Djamena

Ambassadors of the United States to Chad
1909 births
1990 deaths
People from Bryn Mawr, Pennsylvania
Haverford College alumni
People from Tiburon, California
United States Foreign Service personnel